Papy-Shumu Lukata (born April 23, 1978, in Kinshasa) is a Congolese football player.

Career
He left in January 2009 his club ASA to sign for league rival Petro de Luanda. Lukata played in the CAF Champions League with Petro Atlético in 1996 and 2010.

International career
He was part of the Congolese 2004 African Nations Cup team, who finished bottom of their group in the first round of competition, thus failing to secure qualification for the quarter-finals. Lukata was dismissed from the team for indiscipline following the tournament.

References

1978 births
Living people
Democratic Republic of the Congo footballers
Democratic Republic of the Congo international footballers
Democratic Republic of the Congo expatriate footballers
Democratic Republic of the Congo expatriate sportspeople in Angola
2004 African Cup of Nations players
Expatriate footballers in Angola
Atlético Petróleos de Luanda players
Atlético Sport Aviação players
Kabuscorp S.C.P. players
TP Mazembe players
Girabola players
Association football goalkeepers
Footballers from Kinshasa